Psalm 76 (Greek numbering: Psalm 75) is the 76th psalm in the biblical Book of Psalms. It refers to the "Majesty of God in Judgment". The Jerusalem Bible regards it as an "ode to God the awe-inspiring".

Text

Hebrew Bible version
Following is the Hebrew text of Psalm 76:

King James Version
The following is the full English text of the Psalm from the King James Bible.
To the chief Musician on Neginoth, A Psalm or Song of Asaph.
 In Judah is God known: his name is great in Israel.
 In Salem also is his tabernacle, and his dwelling place in Zion.
 There brake he the arrows of the bow, the shield, and the sword, and the battle. Selah.
 Thou art more glorious and excellent than the mountains of prey.
 The stouthearted are spoiled, they have slept their sleep: and none of the men of might have found their hands.
 At thy rebuke, O God of Jacob, both the chariot and horse are cast into a dead sleep.
 Thou, even thou, art to be feared: and who may stand in thy sight when once thou art angry?
 Thou didst cause judgment to be heard from heaven; the earth feared, and was still,
 When God arose to judgment, to save all the meek of the earth. Selah.
 Surely the wrath of man shall praise thee: the remainder of wrath shalt thou restrain.
 Vow, and pay unto the LORD your God: let all that be round about him bring presents unto him that ought to be feared.
 He shall cut off the spirit of princes: he is terrible to the kings of the earth.

Verse numbering
In the Hebrew Bible, Psalm 76:1 comprises the designation
To the chief Musician on Neginoth, A Psalm or Song of Asaph. (KJV)
From then on verses 2–13 in the Hebrew text correspond to verses 1–12 in English versions.

Commentary
This psalm shares some similarities with Psalms 46 and 48, and has been interpreted as:
 a celebration of Israelite victory over their enemies
 a part of the New Year Festival in Jerusalem
 a prophecy of God's future victory, 
 a post-exilic praise.
The division of the text (e.g., in the New Revised Standard Version) is usually:
 verses 1–3: praise God who chose Zion as his dwelling and defended his city
 verses 4–6: describe God's victory
 verses 7–9: portray 'a judge who saves the humble'
 verses 10–12: declare that all human beings will worship YHWH and tell them to perform their vows.

According to Gordon Churchyard in the EasyEnglish Translation of the Psalms, this psalm explains that Judah and Israel are both names for God's chosen people. The Jerusalem Bible suggests that the psalm "apparently refers to the defeat of Sennacherib in 701 BC at the gates of Jerusalem": see also Assyrian siege of Jerusalem.

The Sela in verses 3 and 9 provides a 'threefold structure' with the middle section focusing on the 'description of God'.

Uses

Judaism
This psalm is recited on the first day of Sukkot.

Musical settings 
Heinrich Schütz set Psalm 76 in a metred version in German, "In Juda ist der Herr bekannt", SWV 173, as part of the Becker Psalter, first published in 1628.

Marc-Antoine Charpentier set :

 "Notus in Judea Deus" H.179, for 3 voices, 2 treble instruments and continuo (1681), 
 "Notus in Judea Deus" H.219, for soloists, chorus, flutes, strings and continuo (? early1690s).

Jean-Baptiste Lully set:
LWV 77 - Notus in Judea Deus, motet

References

External links 

 in Hebrew and English - Mechon-mamre
 King James Bible - Wikisource

076